Daniele Corvia (born 20 November 1984) is an Italian football coach and a former player who played as a forward. He is an assistant coach for Italian Serie D club Racing Aprilia.

Career
Born in Rome, capital of Italy, Corvia made his Serie A debut during 2003–04 Serie A season. In 2005 Corvia was farmed to Ternana for a peppercorn of €500.

Corvia joined Siena for €200,000 after the co-ownership deal with Ternana terminated with Roma favour, for €50,000. In June 2007, Siena bought him outright for another €375,000. In summer 2009 he started his second spell at U.S. Lecce, after spending the second half of the 2007-08 season with the club, helping them to promotion to the Serie A.

On 10 September 2012, he joined Serie B side Brescia on loan from Lega Pro Prima Divisione side Lecce following their relegation from the Serie A and subsequent expulsion from the Serie B. On 19 June 2013 Corvia joined Brescia outright for €180,000. On 2 August 2013 he signed a contract which last until 30 June 2016.

Yet on 13 July 2015 Corvia joined Latina on a free transfer.

References

External links
Gazzetta dello Sports player profile 
http://www.figc.it/nazionali/DettaglioConvocato?codiceConvocato=2832&squadra=2

1984 births
Living people
Italy under-21 international footballers
Italian footballers
Association football forwards
A.S. Roma players
Ternana Calcio players
A.C.N. Siena 1904 players
U.S. Lecce players
Empoli F.C. players
Brescia Calcio players
Latina Calcio 1932 players
S.S. Racing Club Fondi players
F.C. Aprilia Racing Club players
Serie A players
Serie B players
Serie C players
Serie D players
Italian football managers